Michael Smith (born 18 September 1990) is an English professional darts player. Nicknamed "Bully Boy", he plays in Professional Darts Corporation (PDC) events, where he is the reigning World Champion and World No. 1, having won the 2023 World Championship. 

Smith was the 2013 PDC Under-21 World Champion and has since won 17 titles on the PDC Pro Tour. He won his first PDC major title at the 2022 Grand Slam of Darts, having previously been a runner-up at the World Championship (2019 and 2022), the Premier League (2018), the World Matchplay (2019), the European Championship (2022), the UK Open (2022), The Masters (2020), and the World Series Finals (2018).

Early life
Smith attended Saint Cuthbert's High School in St Helens. When he was 15, he fell off his bike on the way to school breaking his hip, which required him to use crutches for 16 weeks. During that period, Smith threw his first 180 whilst on crutches. After leaving school, he took a joinery course at college, but he decided to drop out with one exam remaining to play in a darts tournament instead, a decision that he has described as the best of his life. He was a regular winner of local darts events and made his debut in a PDC major at the 2009 UK Open where he lost 6–5 to Dave Ladley in the first round.

Career
Smith reached the last 32 of the 2010 UK Open, knocking out Peter Manley and Matt Clark before losing to Mervyn King. He was one of a number of young players to make a significant impact in the tournament, along with William O'Connor, Arron Monk, and Reece Robinson.

He was the number four seed for the 2011 PDC Under-21 World Championship, where he lost in the quarter-finals to Benito van de Pas.

On 26 February 2011, Smith hit a nine-dart finish in a PDC Youth Tour event in Barnsley, against Michael van Gerwen. He reached the final but lost to Shaun Griffiths. The following day, he won his first PDC Pro Tour event, defeating Dave Chisnall 6–5 in the final of the 2011 UK Open Qualifier 2.

2012
Smith had now become a full-time professional on the PDC darts Circuit and made his debut at the World Championships in 2012, losing 0–3 to Co Stompé in the first round. Smith only hit 3 of his 14 darts at a double during the match.
Smith won his second professional tournament in January 2012, at the Players Championship Event 2 in Benidorm. He won seven matches, concluding with a 6–3 victory over Justin Pipe to take the title and the £6,000 prize money. In April, he earned a place in the European Tour Event 1 in Vienna by defeating Les Wallace and Shaun Griffiths in the UK qualifier. He played Jamie Caven in the first round and hit a nine dart finish on his way to a 6–4 win, but then lost 5–6 to Mark Walsh in round two. His results meant he qualified for the World Matchplay for the first time in his career via the ProTour Order of Merit. He faced Raymond van Barneveld in the first round and was beaten 4–10. Smith also played in the World Grand Prix for the first time, losing to Phil Taylor 0–2 in the first round. After all 33 ProTour events of 2012 had been played, Smith was 25th on the Order of Merit, inside the top 32 who qualified for the Players Championship Finals. It was Smith's first appearance in the tournament and he beat Ian White 6–5 in the first round before losing 6–10 to Kim Huybrechts.

2013
Smith's position on the ProTour Order of Merit also saw him qualify for the 2013 World Championship, as he took the second of sixteen places that were awarded to the highest non-qualified players. However, he ran into an in-form Raymond van Barneveld in the first round who averaged 108.31 as Smith could only win one leg during the match in a 0–3 defeat.
Smith reached the final of the third UK Open Qualifier in March, but was beaten 2–6 by Michael van Gerwen.
Smith won the 2013 PDC World Youth Championship with a 6–1 victory over Ricky Evans, which was broadcast just before the 2013 Premier League Darts Final. Smith led van Barneveld 3–0 in the third round of the UK Open but went on to lose 8–9. In October, he advanced to the semi-finals for the second time in 2013 at the 12th Players Championship but his run was ended with a 6–3 defeat to Kevin Painter. His youth title earned him a place in the Grand Slam of Darts and he produced an impressive display in his first group match against Dave Chisnall as from 3–1 down he hit legs of 11, 12, 14, and 13 darts to win 5–3 with an average of 103.17. However, he then lost 5–2 to Scott Waites and 5–1 to Ted Hankey to finish third in Group H and be eliminated from the tournament.

2014
Smith broke into the world's top 32 on the Order of Merit just before the cut-off for the 2014 World Championship to qualify through the main ranking list for the first time. He beat Morihiro Hashimoto 3–1 in the first round.
He then defeated reigning and 16-time world champion Phil Taylor 4–3 in the second round, taking out the bullseye on a 128 finish to win the match. In the next round, Smith hit a 136 finish, with his opponent Peter Wright waiting on 41, to lead 3–2 but only won one more leg after this to lose 4–3. He was named the PDC's Young Player of the Year at the Annual Awards in January. Smith won through to the final of the sixth UK Open Qualifier of the year but averaged just 70.94 as he was whitewashed 6–0 by Michael van Gerwen. A rematch against Wright followed in the third round of the UK Open with Smith throwing for the match in the final leg, but he missed a total of seven darts at doubles to lose 9–8. His second final of 2014 was at the fifth Players Championship, which he reached by beating Raymond van Barneveld 6–3 in the quarter-finals and Gary Anderson 6–4 in the semis, but he was again whitewashed in the decider, this time by Brendan Dolan.

At the World Matchplay, he recorded a 10–8 victory over Justin Pipe before losing 13–6 to Taylor in the second round. At the European Darts Grand Prix, Smith eliminated Gary Anderson, Adrian Lewis, and Stephen Bunting en route to facing Mervyn King in the final. Smith missed too many doubles throughout the match, including one to claim the title, as he lost his third ranking final of the year 6–5. Another final followed a week later at the 14th Players Championship where he lost 6–4 to Van Gerwen. Smith's rich vein of form continued into the European Darts Trophy as he reached the final and came back from 3–0 against Van Gerwen to win the title 6–5, which included a 158 finish to break throw in the ninth leg. He suffered first round exits at the World Grand Prix and European Championship, but topped Group F at the Grand Slam by winning all three of his games. Smith knocked out Christian Kist 10–5 but was then beaten 16–3 by Taylor in the quarter-finals, losing 13 consecutive legs from 3–3. His year in the major events concluded with a 6–4 defeat to Andy Smith in the opening round of the Players Championship Finals.

2015
After seeing off Mensur Suljović 3–1 in the first round of the 2015 World Championship, Smith beat Brendan Dolan 4–2 after having been 2–0 down, to set up a third round tie with fellow St. Helens player Stephen Bunting. Despite taking out checkouts of 170 and 132, Smith was 3–0 down, before finding his scoring game to restrict Bunting to one leg as he closed the gap to 3–2. Ultimately his slow start to the match proved costly as he lost the next set to be knocked out 4–2 in a game that saw each player average 102 and hit eight 180s apiece. Smith won the fifth UK Open Qualifier by beating Adrian Lewis 6–5. A rematch with Bunting followed in the third round of the UK Open, with Smith missing two match darts in the deciding leg to be beaten 9–8. He claimed the second European Tour title of his career by winning the International Darts Open with a 6–3 victory over Benito van de Pas in the final. Smith suffered a 10–4 defeat to Gerwyn Price in the first round of the World Matchplay, but retained his European Darts Trophy title by seeing off Michael van Gerwen in the final for the second year in a row. At the World Grand Prix, he punished two missed match darts from Price to beat him 2–1, but Smith then lost from 2–0 up in sets against Jamie Lewis in the second round. Wins over Wayne Jones, Lewis and Andy Fordham saw Smith top his group at the Grand Slam and he then averaged 104.59 to beat Dave Chisnall 10–7 and reach the quarter-finals. Smith's first major event semi-final soon followed as he defeated Lewis 16–11, but he was heavily beaten 16–6 by Van Gerwen.

2016
At the 2016 World Championship wins over Jeffrey de Zwaan, Steve Beaton, and Benito van de Pas saw Smith reach the quarter-finals for the first time, where he was 3–0 ahead of Raymond van Barneveld. He could only win two legs as Van Barneveld moved 4–3 up, but he took the next to take the match to a ninth and final set. Smith finished 130 on double five to move within a leg of the match and missed one dart to win it, before Van Barneveld won four legs in a row to end Smith's event. Smith made his debut in the Premier League after receiving a wildcard from the PDC. On the opening night, he played twice due to Gary Anderson being ill. Smith lost his first matches 7–2 to Peter Wright and 7–1 to Adrian Lewis. His first point came in week three courtesy of a 6–6 draw with Dave Chisnall. Michael van Gerwen scored a world record three-dart average of 123.40 against Smith in a 7–1 win, but the following week, Smith got his first Premier League victory by beating Van Barneveld 7–5. However, Smith lost his last two matches to finish bottom of the table and be eliminated from the event.

Smith played in the final of the 2016 Austrian Darts Open and lost 6–4 to Phil Taylor. He saw off Simon Whitlock 10–6 at the World Matchplay before losing 11–7 to Steve Beaton in the second round and was knocked out 2–1 in sets by Alan Norris in the first round of the World Grand Prix. Smith was also eliminated in the first round of the European Championship and Players Championship Finals.

2017

Smith entered the 2017 World Championship without a match win since September 2016 having lost 10 in a row. He took the deciding set of his first round match with Ricky Evans without dropping a leg and said he had been "fighting his demons" recently. In the next round, he missed five darts to eliminate Mervyn King 4–1, but kept his composure to eventually see him off 4–3. Smith went 3–1 up on James Wade in the third round, but after Wade took the next set, Smith lost six legs in a row to be eliminated 4–3. He missed two darts to win the third UK Open Qualifier as Peter Wright beat him 6–5. Four 6–5 wins saw him reach the final of the Gibraltar Darts Trophy and at 4–4 he took out a 132 finish with Mensur Suljović waiting on 56 to break throw and took home his first title in nearly two years with a 6–4 victory. Smith qualified for the 2017 European Championship as third seed, losing in the quarter-final to Rob Cross.

2018
Smith was thirteenth seeded at the 2018 World Championship, losing in the second round to eventual champion Rob Cross, having missed two match darts. Following the championship, Smith was invited into the 2018 Premier League, the second invitation to the Premier League he had received. Smith finished the league phase in second place, qualifying for the play-offs. He beat Gary Anderson in the semi-final before losing in the final 4–11 to Michael van Gerwen.

2018 also saw Smith win his first event on the World Series of Darts, taking the 2018 Shanghai Darts Masters with an 8–2 win over Rob Cross in the final. Smith reached the final of the 2018 World Series of Darts Finals, missing five darts to take the title in a 10–11 defeat to James Wade.

2019
Smith was tenth seed at the 2019 World Championship. In the second round, he eliminated Ron Meulenkamp before beating John Henderson and Ryan Searle to reach the quarter-final. He reached his first World Championship semi-final with a 5–1 victory over Luke Humphries, then beat Nathan Aspinall in the semi-final to set up a final against Michael van Gerwen. Smith was defeated in the final, 3–7.

He reached the final of the 2019 World Matchplay, where he faced Rob Cross. Smith lost the first 9 legs of the match and eventually lost 13–18.

2020
Smith suffered an early exit at the 2020 World Championship, losing to Luke Woodhouse in the second round. Smith missed three match darts to beat Peter Wright in the final of the 2020 Masters, losing 11–10 in a last leg decider. He had previously defeated Mensur Suljović, Adrian Lewis, and Nathan Aspinall to reach the final. 

On 27 February 2020, in week 4 of the 2020 Premier League, Smith hit his first televised nine-dart leg in a 7–5 victory over Daryl Gurney.

2021
Smith had another early exit at the 2021 World Championship, losing again in the second round, this time to Jason Lowe.

At the 2021 Grand Slam of Darts, he beat Michael van Gerwen 16–13 to reach the semi-finals, where he eventually lost 16–12 to Peter Wright. Smith led 12–8, but Wright won eight consecutive legs to clinch a place in the final against Gerwyn Price.

2022

Smith began his 2022 World Championship campaign with a comfortable 3–0 win over Ron Meulenkamp, before defeating William O'Connor 4–2. The next two games saw him take on two of the most in-form players from the 2021 season; first defeating Jonny Clayton in a last-set shootout that went to extra legs; and then triumphing over defending champion Gerwyn Price, surviving two match darts before winning the final set. In the semi-final Smith took an early lead over James Wade and eventually triumphed 6–3, reaching the final for the second time in his career. Smith lost the final 7–5 to Peter Wright and claimed £200,000 as runner-up.

Smith reached the final of the UK Open in March, but lost 11–10 to Danny Noppert despite Noppert only averaging 84.82 to see his 7th final defeat. He recovered well to win a night event on the final standard night of the 2022 Premier League, but came 7th in the table and did not qualify for the playoff places. His good form after the UK Open continued, winning 3 Pro Tour titles in a short period and performing well in the European Tour. 

In July, Smith reached the last 16 of the 2022 World Matchplay, where he was beaten 11–7 by Dirk van Duijvenbode. In October, Smith reached an eighth major televised final, losing 11–8 to namesake Ross in the European Championship final. The following month, Smith finally won his first major title at his ninth attempt in the 2022 Grand Slam of Darts. He consecutively defeated Lisa Ashton, Joe Cullen, Ritchie Edhouse, Rob Cross, Joe Cullen (second time in the tournament), and Raymond van Barneveld before defeating Nathan Aspinall 16–5 in the final.

2023: World Championship win

Smith opened his 2023 World Championship campaign with a 3–0 win over Nathan Rafferty. In the third round Smith came from 3–1 down to beat Martin Schindler 4–3, before beating Joe Cullen and Stephen Bunting to reach the semi-finals. In the semi-final Smith beat Gabriel Clemens 6–2 to reach his third World Championship final. 
In the final, Smith hit a nine dart finish only seconds after Michael van Gerwen missed Double 12 for his own nine darter.|
After a back and forth match, Smith broke van Gerwen's throw and held his own throw to lead 6–3. After losing the tenth set and going two down in the eleventh set, Smith won two legs in a row to throw for the match. Smith finished in eleven darts to win 7–4 and become world champion for the first time and move up to world number one in the PDC Order of Merit for the first time. He also became the first player to win both the PDC World Youth Championship and the PDC World Darts Championship.

Personal life
On 4 March 2023, Smith was nominated for Freedom of the Borough status by St Helens Borough Council for sporting services to his hometown city, the highest honour a council can award.

World Championship results

PDC
 2012: First round (lost to Co Stompé 0–3)
 2013: First round (lost to Raymond van Barneveld 0–3)
 2014: Third round (lost to Peter Wright 3–4)
 2015: Third round (lost to Stephen Bunting 2–4)
 2016: Quarter-finals (lost to Raymond van Barneveld 4–5)
 2017: Third round (lost to James Wade 3–4
 2018: Second round (lost to Rob Cross 3–4)
 2019: Runner-up (lost to Michael van Gerwen 3–7)
 2020: Second round (lost to Luke Woodhouse 1–3)
 2021: Second round (lost to Jason Lowe 1–3)
 2022: Runner-up (lost to Peter Wright 5–7)
 2023: Winner (beat Michael van Gerwen 7–4)

Career finals

PDC major finals: 10 (2 titles, 8 runners-up)

PDC World Series finals: 5 (3 titles, 2 runners-up)

PDC team finals: 1 (1 runner-up)

Performance timeline
 

PDC European Tour

Nine-dart finishes

References

External links
 
 

1990 births
Living people
English darts players
Sportspeople from St Helens, Merseyside
Professional Darts Corporation current tour card holders
PDC world darts champions
Grand Slam of Darts champions
World Series of Darts winners
PDC world youth champions
Darts players who have thrown televised nine-dart games
PDC World Cup of Darts English team
21st-century English people